Daniel Goldman (October 30, 1939 – April 12, 2020) was an American actor and casting director. He was most widely recognized as the voice of Brainy Smurf in Hanna-Barbera's The Smurfs (1981–1989).

Early life
Goldman graduated from Far Rockaway High School in Queens, New York City, in 1957. He subsequently attended and graduated from Columbia University in Manhattan, in 1961.

Career
One of his first roles was that of Nick Dutton, the son of an industrialist who knew the truth about his family's new butler and housekeeper, and helped them get acquainted in their new jobs in the 1971 situation comedy The Good Life. Among his other early roles on television were appearances in the TV shows That Girl; Room 222; The Partridge Family; Love, American Style; Needles and Pins; Columbo; Baretta and Chico and the Man. He was a regular member of the cast of the situation comedy Busting Loose in 1977. Goldman was also featured as Ozzie the Answer in the 1980s detective drama Mickey Spillane's Mike Hammer and as Dr. Denton on Get Smart, Again! He acted in the episode "I'll Kill 'Em Again" of police drama Hawaii Five-O and in the episodes "Brain Child" and "42" in Trapper John, M.D. Goldman appeared as a panelist on the What's My Line? TV program during its syndicated run, and on the live stage version in Hollywood several years later. In 2005, he appeared in an episode of the sitcom The King of Queens.

His feature film debut was in MASH (1970). Other credits included a small role as a persistent medical student who asks Dr. Frankenstein (Gene Wilder) about his grandfather in Young Frankenstein (1974), and roles in Busting (1974), Linda Lovelace for President (1975), Tunnel Vision (1976), The Missouri Breaks (1976), Swap Meet (1979), Wholly Moses! (1980) and My Man Adam (1985). He also portrayed Porter in Where the Buffalo Roam (1980).

Goldman voiced the pedantic Brainy Smurf (1981–1989) on the animated series The Smurfs. He returned to the voice of Brainy Smurf for the television show Robot Chicken in a segment titled "Murder in Smurf Town X" that parodied the movie Se7en. The show's creators remarked that of all the casting coups on their show, of which there are many, their greatest was getting Goldman to voice Brainy Smurf in The Smurfs. He would reprise the role several more times on Robot Chicken, whenever Brainy Smurf appears in a sketch, up until the sketch "House of Smurfs" (a parody of House of Cards).

For nearly 30 years, Goldman was a casting director of television commercials in Hollywood.

Death
Goldman died in his home in Los Angeles on 12 April 2020, from complications of two strokes.

Filmography
MASH (1970) as Capt. Murrhardt
The Strawberry Statement (1970) as Charlie
Beware! The Blob (1972) as Bearded Teenager
The World's Greatest Athlete (1973) as Leopold Maxwell
The Long Goodbye (1973) as Bartender (uncredited)
Why (1973) as The Businessman
Busting (1974) as Mr. Crosby
Win, Place or Steal (1974) as Froggy
Young Frankenstein (1974) as Medical Student
Linda Lovelace for President (1975) as Bruce Whippoorwill
Tunnel Vision (1976) as Barry Flanken
The Missouri Breaks (1976) as Baggage Clerk
Beyond Death's Door (1979)
Swap Meet (1979) as Ziggy
Where the Buffalo Roam (1980) as Porter
Wholly Moses! (1980) as Scribs
The Smurfs (1981–1989, TV series) as Brainy Smurf (voice)
Mickey Spillane's Mike Hammer (1984–1987, TV series) as Ozzie "The Answer"
My Man Adam (1985) as Dr. Blaustein
General Hospital (1991, TV series) as Clarence Darrow
Capitol Critters (1992, TV series) as Opie the Squirrel (voice)
Batman: The Animated Series (1993, TV series) as Sam Giddell (voice)
Mighty Max (1994, TV series) as Marlin Curt / Cyberskull (voice)
Free (2001) as Dr. Franklin Gibbles
The King of Queens (2005) as Jacob
Robot Chicken (2005–2011, TV series) as Brainy Smurf (voice)
Criminal Minds (2011–2012, TV series) as Detective Bob Zablonsky (final film role)

References

External links

1939 births
2020 deaths
20th-century American male actors
21st-century American male actors
American casting directors
American male comedy actors
American male television actors
American male voice actors
Columbia University alumni
Far Rockaway High School alumni
Male actors from New York City